Bogalur block is a revenue block in the Ramanathapuram district of Tamil Nadu, India. It has a total of 26 panchayat villages.

Bogalur is the main panchayath Union for the surrounding villages.

Educational institutions 

 Dheeniya Aided Ps, T.Karungulam
 Gt. Hs, Kamankottai
 Gt. Hs, Manjur
 Gt. Hss, Sathirakudi
 Harijan Aided Ps, Muthuvayal (Owner-Sethuraman)
 Idar Theertha Amman Ps, Theeya
 Model Nur&Pri Scl, Sathirakudi
 N.M.S. S.V. Hs, Arasadivandal
 N.M.S.Pandianar Ps, Arasadivan
 Noorullah Muslim Ps, 
 Pums, A.Puthur
 Pums, K.Valasai
 Pums, Manjakkollai
 Pums, Mennandhi
 Pums, Mudalur
 Pums, Muthuvayal
 Pums, Pottithatti
 Pums, S.Kodikulam
 Pums, Sevvoor
 Pums, Veeravanoor
 Pups, Anaikudi
 Pups, Ariyakudi
 Pups,  Bogalur
 Pups, Chinna Nagachi
 Pups, Ettivayal
 Pups, Ilanthaikulam,
 Pups, K. Karungulam
 Pups, Kakkanendal
 Pups, Kamankottai
 Pups, Karuthanendal
 Pups, Kavuthakudi
 Pups, Keelakkottai
 Pups, Keelambal
 Pups, Manjur
 Pups, Manthivalasai
 Pups, Mavilangai
 Pups, Meyyanendal
 Pups, Pandikanmai
 Pups, Poovalathur
 Pass nursery and primary school, Bogalur
 Pups, Sathirakudi
 Pups, Semanoor (North)
 Pups, Semanoor (South)
 Pups, Seyyalur
 Pups, Theivendranallur
 Pups, Thenchiyendal
 Pups, Thennavanur
 Pups, Thiruvadi
 Pups, Thurathiyendal
 Pups, Urathur
 Pups, Vairavanendal-North
 Pups, Vairavanendal-South
 Pups, Vananganendal
 Rcps, A. Puthur (Muthuchellapuram
 Telc Ps, Mudalur
 Vasan Matric Scl, Sathirakudi  
 RK Samy matric school, Seyyalur  
 Rk Samy teacher training institute, Seyyalur
 Meenakshi matric school, Chinna Ithampadal

References 

 

Revenue blocks of Ramanathapuram district